The Fruit Machine is a 2018 Canadian documentary film, directed by Sarah Fodey. The film profiles the "fruit machine", a controversial device used by the Canadian government in the 1950s and 1960s in an attempt to identify LGBT employees and disqualify them from the civil service, and its effects on the people whose lives and careers were disrupted or destroyed by the test.

Figures interviewed in the film include Michelle Douglas, John Ibbitson, John Sawatsky and Gary Kinsman.

The film premiered at the Inside Out Film and Video Festival on June 1, 2018, and had selected other film festival screenings before airing as a TVOntario special presentation on September 29.

The film received a Canadian Screen Award nomination for Best Documentary Program at the 7th Canadian Screen Awards in 2019.

References

External links
 

2018 films
2018 documentary films
2018 LGBT-related films
Canadian documentary television films
Canadian LGBT-related films
Documentary films about LGBT topics
Films about anti-LGBT sentiment
2010s English-language films
2010s Canadian films